Richard Gotti may refer to:

 Richard G. Gotti (born 1967), Mafioso, son of Richard V. Gotti
 Richard V. Gotti (born 1942), Mafioso, brother of John Gotti

See also
Gotti (surname)